The 1st 1983 World Championships in Athletics were run under the auspices of the International Association of Athletics Federations and were held at the Olympic Stadium in Helsinki, Finland between 7 and 14 August 1983.

Summary

The overall medal table was a closely contested affair. East Germany took the most gold medals (10) over the first championships and finished with a total of 22 medals. The United States had the next largest number of golds, with eight, and also had the greatest overall medal haul, having won 24 medals altogether. The Soviet Union won one more medal than the East Germans and had six golds, although almost half of their podium finishers were bronze medalists. Twenty-five nations reached the medal tally at the inaugural competition, with all six continents being represented. During the early 1980s this was the top venue in which Soviet Bloc athletes competed against American athletes due to the American-led boycott of the 1980 Olympics in Moscow and the retaliatory Soviet Bloc boycott of the 1984 Olympics in Los Angeles.

Carl Lewis won both the 100 metres and the long jump, and finished the competition by anchoring the 4×100 metres relay team to a world record time, along with the 200 metres champion Calvin Smith, and bronze medallists Emmit King and Willie Gault. Jarmila Kratochvílová dominated the 400 metres and 800 metres events, setting a world record of 47.99 seconds. Mary Decker enjoyed her best competition performance, taking the golds in the women's 1500 metres and 3000 metres. Other prominent athletes included Marita Koch, who won the 200 m and both relay golds, as well as the 100 m silver medal. Sergey Bubka won the first of his six consecutive World Championship gold medals in the pole vault.

Men's results

Track

1983 | 1987 | 1991 | 1993 | 1995

Note: * Indicates athletes who ran in preliminary rounds.

Field
1983 | 1987 | 1991 | 1993 | 1995

Women's results

Track
1983 | 1987 | 1991 | 1993 | 1995

Note: * Indicates athletes who ran in preliminary rounds.

Field
1983 | 1987 | 1991 | 1993 | 1995

Medal table

See also
 1983 in athletics (track and field)

References
 IAAF

External links

 Summary at SVT's open archive

 
World Athletics Championships
World Championships
International sports competitions in Helsinki
World Championships in Athletics
International athletics competitions hosted by Finland
Athletics World Championships
1980s in Helsinki
Athletics in Helsinki